Annariitta Kottonen (born 27 July 1958) is a Finnish orienteering competitor. She received a bronze medal in the individual event at the 1983 World Orienteering Championships in Zalaegerszeg, behind Annichen Kringstad and Marita Skogum. She finished 11th at the 1985 World championships.

See also
 Finnish orienteers
 List of orienteers
 List of orienteering events

References

1958 births
Living people
Finnish orienteers
Female orienteers
Foot orienteers
World Orienteering Championships medalists